Gustavo Adolfo Martínez Zuviría (October 23, 1883March 28, 1962), best known under his pseudonym Hugo Wast, was a renowned Argentine novelist and script writer.

Biography
Born Gustavo Martínez Zuviría in Córdoba, Argentina, his family relocated to Santa Fe, and he enrolled at the University of Santa Fe, receiving a law degree in 1907. Martínez Zuviría first used the pen name "Hugo Wast" for his 1911 novel, Flor de Durazno (Peach Blossom) - his first commercial success. He was elected to the Argentine Chamber of Deputies in 1916 as a Conservative and received the National Literary Prize for his realist novel, Desierto de piedra (Stone Desert), but he was also known for his anti-semitism - established with his inflammatory Oro (Gold) - and his ideological association with French "integrisme," a Catholic nationalist doctrine associated with the National Front.

He was appointed director of the National Library of Argentina in 1931, and in 1943, as Minister of Public Instruction for the newly installed military government of General Pedro Ramírez, he reinstated religious education in public schools, thus breaking from a sixty-year secular tradition in Argentine education.

A souring of relations with the Catholic Church on the part of President Juan Perón led to Wast's dismissal as National Library Director in 1955. The writer died in Buenos Aires in 1962.

Works
 (1905). Alegre.
 (1907). Novia de Vacaciones.
 (1911). Flor de Durazno. 
 (1914). Fuente Sellada.
 (1916). La Casa de los Cuervos.
 (1918). Valle Negro.
 (1919). Ciudad Turbulenta, Ciudad Alegre. 
 (1920). La Corbata Celeste.
 (1921). Los Ojos Vendados. 
 (1922). El Vengador.
 (1923). La que no Perdonó.
 (1924). Pata de Zorra.
 (1924). Una Estrella en la Ventana.
 (1925). Desierto de Piedra.
 (1926). Las Espigas de Ruth.
 (1926). El Jinete de Fuego.
 (1926). Myriam La Conspiradora.
 (1927). Tierra de Jaguares.
 (1927). Sangre en el Umbral. 
 (1929). Lucía Miranda.
 (1930). 15 Dias Sacristán. 
 (1930). El Camino de las Llamas.
 (1931). Vocacion de Escritor.
 (1931). Don Bosco y su Tiempo.
 (1935). El Kahal. 
 (1935). Oro.
 (1935). Buenos Aires, Futura Babilonia.
 (1936). Naves, Oro, Sueños. 
 (1941). El Sexto Sello.
 (1942). Juana Tabor.
 (1942). 666.
 (1944). Esperar Contra Toda Esperanza. 
 (1945). Lo que Dios ha Unido. 
 (1948). Alma Romana. 
 (1948). Su Segunda Patria. 
 (1952). Morir con las Botas Puestas. 
 (1955). Estrella de la Tarde. 
 (1960). Año X.
 (1963). Autobiografía del Hijito que no Nació. 
 (1964). Navega Hacia Alta Mar. 

Collected works
 (1942). Todas las Novelas de Hugo Wast.
 (1956-57). Obras Completas de Hugo Wast (2 vols.)

Works in English translation
 (1924). The House Of The Ravens.
 (1928). Black Valley.
 (1928). Stone Desert.
 (1929). Peach Blossom.
 (1930). The Strength of Lovers.

References

Further reading
 Coester, Alfred (1933). "Bibliografía de 'Hugo Wast'", Hispania, Vol. 16, No. 2, pp. 187–188.
 Cavness, Raymond McCarey (1930). The Social Principles of Hugo Wast. Thesis (M.A.) - University of Texas.
 Gallaway, Rowana (1930). "Pater Familiae," The Pan American Magazine 43, pp. 212–13.
 Hespelth, Herman (1924). "Hugo Wast – Argentine Novelist," Hispania 7, pp. 360–7.
 Jones, Cecil Knight (1930). "Regionalistic Novelist," The Pan American Magazine 43, pp. 210–12.
 Rennie, Ysabel (1945). "The Opposition." In: The Argentine Republic. New York: The Macmillan Company, pp. 355–62.
 Whelan, Mary Angele (1948). The Novel of Hugo Wast and its Significance in Contemporary Argentine Literature. Thesis (M.A.) - Loyola University.

External links
 
 hugowast.com.ar 
 
 Los Ojos Vendados.

20th-century Argentine male writers
Members of the Argentine Chamber of Deputies elected in Santa Fe
Education ministers
Government ministers of Argentina
Integralism
Argentine fascists
People from Córdoba, Argentina
People from Santa Fe, Argentina
Argentine people of Spanish descent
National University of the Littoral alumni
1883 births
1962 deaths
Argentine anti-communists
Burials at La Recoleta Cemetery